= Largest cities on the Atlantic Ocean =

This is a list of every city situated on the Atlantic Ocean by population residing within city limits exceeding 1,000,000 , on the most recent year for which official population census results, estimates, or short-term projections are available for most of these cities. These figures do not reflect the population of the urban agglomeration or metropolitan area which typically do not coincide with the administrative boundaries of the city. Note that this list also includes cities situated on the Mediterranean Sea. The main criterion for the city to be situated in the Atlantic Ocean is if its limits are located on a shoreline that touches the said ocean or a sea connected to this ocean.

| | City | Image | Country | Population | Year |
|---|---|---|---|---|---|
| 1 | Lagos | | Nigeria | 16,536,018 | 2024 |
| 2 | Istanbul | | Turkey | 15,655,924 | 2023 |
| 3 | New York City | | United States | 8,992,908 | 2022 |
| 4 | Luanda | | Angola | 8,952,496 | 2022 |
| 5 | Rio de Janeiro | | Brazil | 6,211,223 | 2021 |
| 6 | Saint Petersburg | | Russia | 5,597,763 | 2024 |
| 7 | Abidjan | | Ivory Coast | 5,515,790 | 2022 |
| 8 | Alexandria | | Egypt | 5,483,605 | 2022 |
| 9 | Cape Town | | South Africa | 4,800,954 | 2022 |
| 10 | İzmir | | Turkey | 4,479,525 | 2023 |
| 11 | Douala | | Cameroon | 3,926,645 | 2022 |
| 12 | Casablanca | | Morocco | 3,840,396 | 2022 |
| 13 | Dakar | | Senegal | 3,326,001 | 2022 |
| 14 | Buenos Aires | | Argentina | 3,054,267 | 2015 |
| 15 | Salvador | | Brazil | 2,900,319 | 2021 |
| 16 | Algiers | | Algeria | 2,853,959 | 2022 |
| 17 | Fortaleza | | Brazil | 2,703,391 | 2021 |
| 18 | Accra | | Ghana | 2,605,402 | 2022 |
| 19 | Tunis | | Tunisia | 2,435,961 | 2022 |
| 20 | Havana | | Cuba | 2,117,625 | 2015 |
| 21 | Conakry | | Guinea | 2,048,525 | 2022 |
| 22 | Rabat | | Morocco | 1,931,930 | 2022 |
| 23 | Lomé | | Togo | 1,925,517 | 2022 |
| 24 | Recife | | Brazil | 2,703,391 | 2021 |
| 25 | Barcelona | | Spain | 1,660,122 | 2023 |
| 26 | Maracaibo | | Venezuela | 1,653,211 | 2015 |
| 27 | Monrovia | | Liberia | 1,622,582 | 2022 |
| 28 | Belém | | Brazil | 1,506,420 | 2021 |
| 29 | Santo Domingo | | Dominican Republic | 1,029,110 | 2022 |
